Otto Eberhardt Patronenfabrik (English: "Otto Eberhardt Cartridge Factory") was a munitions company established in 1860. The company's Hirtenberger Patronen, Zündhütchen und Metallwarenfabrik (English: "cartridge, primer and metalware fabrication in Hirtenberg") near Wiener Neustadt (proofmark "am") used forced labor during World War II from a sub-camp of the Mauthausen-Gusen concentration camp and produced ammunition including 9×19mm Parabellum (pistol and submachine gun) and 8 mm Mauser (rifle) cartridges.  The company also had a factory in Ronsdorf near Wuppertal (proofmark "ap") which produced rifles.  Additional Gustloff facilities were in Meiningen and Weimar.

Hirtenberg aircraft
Otto Eberhardt Patronenfabrik also purchased the assets of the Hopfner aircraft company in 1935. They continued production of both de Havilland- and Siemens-powered aircraft under the Hirtenberg brand. They produced the Hirtenberg HS.9 under their brand.

Unbuilt projects
From
 Hopfner H.A.M.11 (amphibious twin-engine aircraft based on H.A.11/33)
 H.M.15 (six-seat, twin-engine military aircraft based on the HV.15)

References

External links
 

Manufacturing companies established in 1860
Defunct companies of Austria
Economy of Lower Austria
Austria in World War II